In 4-dimensional complex geometry, the Witting polytope is a regular complex polytope, named as: 3{3}3{3}3{3}3, and Coxeter diagram . It has 240 vertices, 2160 3{} edges, 2160 3{3}3 faces, and 240 3{3}3{3}3 cells. It is self-dual. Each vertex belongs to 27 edges, 72 faces, and 27 cells, corresponding to the Hessian polyhedron vertex figure.

Symmetry

Structure
The configuration matrix is:

The number of vertices, edges, faces, and cells are seen in the diagonal of the matrix. These are computed by the order of the group divided by the order of the subgroup, by removing certain complex reflections, shown with X below. The number of elements of the k-faces are seen in rows below the diagonal. The number of elements in the vertex figure, etc., are given in rows above the digonal.

Coordinates
Its 240 vertices are given coordinates in : 

where .

The last 6 points form hexagonal holes on one of its 40 diameters. There are 40 hyperplanes contain central 3{3}3{4}2,  figures, with 72 vertices.

Witting configuration 
Coxeter named it after Alexander Witting for being a Witting configuration in complex projective 3-space:
 or 

The Witting configuration is related to the finite space PG(3,22), consisting of 85 points, 357 lines, and 85 planes.

Related real polytope
Its 240 vertices are shared with the real 8-dimensional polytope 421, . Its 2160 3-edges are sometimes drawn as 6480 simple edges, slightly less than the 6720 edges of 421. The 240 difference is accounted by 40 central hexagons in 421 whose edges are not included in 3{3}3{3}3{3}3.

The honeycomb of Witting polytopes 

The regular Witting polytope has one further stage as a 4-dimensional honeycomb, . It has the Witting polytope as both its facets, and vertex figure. It is self-dual, and its dual coincides with itself.

Hyperplane sections of this honeycomb include 3-dimensional honeycombs .

The honeycomb of Witting polytopes has a real representation as the 8-dimensional polytope 521, .

Its f-vector element counts are in proportion: 1, 80, 270, 80, 1. The configuration matrix for the honeycomb is:

Notes

References
 Coxeter, H. S. M. and Moser, W. O. J.; Generators and Relations for Discrete Groups (1965), esp pp 67–80.
 Coxeter, H. S. M.; Regular Complex Polytopes, Cambridge University Press, second edition (1991). pp. 132–5, 143, 146, 152.
 Coxeter, H. S. M. and Shephard, G.C.; Portraits of a family of complex polytopes, Leonardo Vol 25, No 3/4, (1992), pp 239–244 

Polytopes
Complex analysis